Hjorthagens IP is a sports ground in Stockholm, Sweden. It has been used by Djurgårdens IF FF as practice ground; by the Djurgårdens IF handicap football association; and by Värtans IK. In winter it serves as an ice skating rink.

On 6 October 2012 three soccer fields using artificial turf were opened.

References 

Sports venues in Stockholm
Football venues in Stockholm